Domfront is a former commune in the Orne department in north-western France. On 1 January 2016, it was merged into the new commune of Domfront-en-Poiraie.

Geography

Domfront is situated on a bluff overlooking the river Varenne and is said to have been established in the 6th century round the oratory of the hermit St. Front, and played an important part in the wars against the English and the French Wars of Religion. Beginning from the strategically sited castle of Domfront, the dispossessed count Henry, youngest son of William the Conqueror, rallied support among local lords and eventually ruled the Anglo-Norman dominions as Henry I of England.

In 1574 it was occupied by the Protestant leader Gabriel, comte de Montgomery, who after a stubborn siege was forced to yield it to Jacques Goyon, Count of Matignon.

It has been subjected to floods when the river Varenne burst its banks, causing widespread havoc and damage to many of the buildings and houses that lay in its path. On 23 December 2020 occurred the highest on record since 1995, when les tanneries were badly affected with the ancient stone bridge being impassable.

Notable people
Claude Du Vall -notorious highwayman in England in the 17th century.

See also
Château de Domfront
Communes of the Orne department
Parc naturel régional Normandie-Maine

References

Former communes of Orne